Brocklesby  is a town in the Riverina region of south west New South Wales, Australia. In the  Brocklesby had a population of 238.

Brocklesby, although having only a very small population prides itself on having an active community, including a long-standing pigeon club. (The pigeon shed was taken down in 2011.) Town buildings include the public hall, a recreation reserve, local primary school and pre-school, and since 2000, a public hotel which is owned by the Greater Hume Shire Council and operating under a community licence.

Historical significance
Brocklesby village was once a main railway centre used for the transportation of grain. Nowadays the grain silos and railway tracks are all that remain and grain is transported by road truck. The area is now characterised by sheep, cattle and grain farmland.

Tom Roberts painted his celebrated masterpiece Shearing the Rams at "Brocklesby" Station at nearby Corowa.

Brocklesby Post Office opened on 29 April 1893.
The new Brocklesby Shop replaced the first shop and opened in mid-2010 and is now closed.

Avro Anson plane crash

The area is also known for a historical emergency landing of two twin-engine Avro Anson training planes that collided overhead and became entangled with one plane sitting on top of the other.

Sports and Recreation
Brocklesby Football Netball Club
The Brocklesby Football Club appears to of had their preliminary meeting in May, 1907 and from there, played a number of friendly games against other local towns up until they played in the Western Division of the Culcairn & District Football Association in 1910 and 1911 against Balldale, Walbundrie and Walla.

Brocklesby's golden era was certainly in the 1920s, when the club played in nine consecutive grand finals between 1923 and 1931, but only won two premierships during this successful period in 1924 and 1928.

In 1939, Brocklesby kicked 34.24 - 228 against Cookardinia, with "Shady" James kicking 19 goals to eclipse the previous best of 14 goals by Vin Smith. 

Brocklesby had a famous grand final victory over Henty to win the 1939 Albury & District Football League premiership after Wally Crooks kicked a goal after the siren, from a free kick to win by two points, under captain / coach, Jim Steigenberger. Henty then lodged an appeal to the Albury & DFL, which was defeated then appealed to the Murray District Football Council, which was then upheld, awarding the premiership to Henty. Brocklesby then appealed that decision to the Victorian Country Football League, which was up held, allowing Brocklesby to finally be declared the 1939 premiers.

Brocklesby FNC have played in the following football competitions - 
 1910 - 1914 - Culcairn & District Football Association (Western District)
 1915 - 1919 - Club in recess due to World War One
 1920 - 1921 - Walla Football Association
 1922 - 1923 - Hume Football Association. Runners Up: 1923
 1924 - 1929 - Riverina Football Association. Premiers: 1924, 1928. Runners Up: 1925, 1926, 1927, 1929
 1930 - Corowa & District Football Association. Runners Up: 1930
 1931 - 1932 - Albury & District Football League. Runners Up: 1931
 1933 - 1934 - Central Hume Football League
 1935 - 1940 - Albury & District Football League. Premiers: 1939
 1941 - 1944 - Club in recess due to World War Two
 1945 - 2005 - Hume Football League. Premiers: 1950 & 1958. Runners Up: 1949, 1976, 1980, 1983, 1984.
 2006 - 2021 - Hume Football League. Merged with Burrumbuttock in 2006. Premiers: 2013, 2015, 2016, 2018. Runners Up: 2019.

VFL / AFL Players
The following VFL / AFL footballers played with Brocklesby FC.
 Vin Smith
 Jim Steigenberger
 Shadrach James 
 Dudley Probyn
 George McInnes
 Justin Koschitzke
 Tony Armstrong

Brocklesby Cricket Club went through the 1913/14 season undefeated and won the premiership.

Brocklesby CC currently play in the Cricket Albury Wodonga Hume Under 13's competition.

Gallery

References

External links
Brocklesby FC History
A History of the Brocklesby FNC. By David Koschitzke
1938 - Brocklesby Female Basketball Club team photo
1928 - Riverina Football Association Premiers: Brocklesby FC team photo
1938 - Brocklesby FC Presentation Night photo
1939 - Albury & DFL semi final team: Brocklesby FC team photo
1939 - Albury & District Football League Premiers: Brocklesby FC team photo
1939 - Brocklesby Cricket Club team photo
1940 - Brocklesby FC coach, G Bedggood photo

Towns in the Riverina
Towns in New South Wales
Greater Hume Shire
1893 establishments in Australia